The Wannenkopf is a mountain in the Hörner Group in the Bavarian Alps in Germany.

Mountains of Bavaria
Mountains of the Alps